Iluka Resources is an Australian-based resources company, specialising in mineral sands exploration, project development, operations and marketing. Iluka is the largest producer of zircon and titanium dioxide-derived rutile and synthetic rutile globally. Iluka mines heavy mineral sands and separates the concentrate into its individual mineral constituents rutile, ilmenite, and zircon. Some of the ilmenite is then processed into synthetic rutile.

Iluka has operations in the Australian states of Western Australia (Eucla and Perth Basins), South Australia (Jacinth-Ambrosia Mine), Victoria and New South Wales (Murray Basin), the United States (Virginia) and Sierra Leone.

History 
Iluka Resources was formed in July 1998 in a merger between Westralian Sands and the titanium mineral business of RGC (Renison Goldfields Consolidated). Westralian Sands was established in 1954 but commenced operations in 1959 when it started mining and processing the Yoganup deposit near Capel in Western Australia.

By 1999, the company (now Iluka Resources) sold off or closed many parts of its business including Westlime Limited, Koba Tin, RGC Thalanga Copper, RGC South Capel operation and its share of the Narama Coal mine in New South Wales.

In September 2008 the company signing a multi-million deal with rail freight operator El Zorro to carry containerised mineral sands from Portland in the south-west of Victoria to Melbourne, with Iluka saying rail transport was cheaper than road.

David Robb was appointed Managing Director and CEO of Iluka Resources Limited on 18 October 2006. Company profits were $61.7 million in 2008, almost three times the size of the forecast amount, this was a result of higher Zircon prices and a devaluation of the Australian dollar.

In March 2009, Iluka announced that it would bring forward the closure of one of the Synthetic Rutile kilns at the Narngulu operations and that 23 jobs would be lost. The move came in response to falling demand as a result of the Global Economic Crisis. As a result of demand from China, the 2011 net year profit increased fifteen times the 2010 result. The 2011 profit was reported as $542 million, compared to $36 million in 2010. The companies profit was driven by higher production with 158,000 tonnes of mineral sands.

On 18 December 2013, Greg Martin was appointed Chairman of Iluka Resources. Greg Martin has previous had over 30 years’ experience in the energy, utility and infrastructure sectors, having spent 25 years with AGL Energy, including five years as CEO and managing director. Greg Martin is currently Chairman of Prostar Investments (Australia) Pty Ltd, and a non-executive Director of Santos, Energy Developments Limited and the industry-funded Australian Energy Market Operator.

Iluka established an initial 18.3 per cent interest in the UK technology company, Metalysis, which is seeking to commercialise technology to convert metals into powder, including titanium powder. Iluka increased its interest to approximately 28 percent in 2016 with additional investment. Iluka also commenced work in 2014 with Vale S.A in relation to the potential commercialisation of a large titanium ore body, with rare earth elements, in Minas Gerais, Brazil. Iluka conducts international exploration, including for selected non-mineral sands opportunities, mainly on its Australian tenements.

The 2015 full-year profit was $53.5 million which was up from a $62.5 million loss in the previous corresponding period. The mineral sands sales increased 1.9% to $950.8 million up from $932.8 million in the previous year.
The dividend was 19c a share (full franked) and increased the annual payout to 25c a share.

Tom O'Leary was appointed chief executive officer of Iluka Resources Limited on 5 September 2016. He was previously managing director of Wesfarmers Chemicals, Energy and Fertilisers division, having been appointed to the role in 2010. Mr O'Leary joined Wesfarmers in 2000 in a Business Development role and was then appointed to managing director, Wesfarmers Energy in 2009. Prior to joining Wesfarmers, Tom O'Leary worked in London for 10 years in finance law, investment banking and private equity. Tom O'Leary holds a law degree from the University of Western Australia and has attended the six-week Advanced Management Program at Harvard Business School. He is a director of the Clontarf Foundation, having been appointed in 2006, and also a member of the Edith Cowan University Council.

In August 2016, Iluka announced its intention to acquire Sierra Leone-based and London Stock Exchange-listed miner Sierra Rutile Limited. The sale was finalised in December 2016 for A$393 million. As part of the acquisition, Iluka intends to invest A$290 million to expand production, improve operation and safety facilities and streamline operations. The Sierra Rutile mine has an extensive, long-life rutile deposit which complements existing assets in titanium oxide. Sierra Rutile will operate as a wholly owned subsidiary.

See also
 Douglas Mine, located in Western Victoria

References 

Mining companies of Australia
Titanium mining
Mining in South Australia
Companies based in Perth, Western Australia
Non-renewable resource companies established in 1998
1998 establishments in Australia
Companies listed on the Australian Securities Exchange